Stuart Conquest (born 1 March 1967 in Ilford, England) is an English chess Grandmaster, commentator and tournament director.

Chess career
In 1981, at the age of 14, he won the World Youth Chess Championship in the under-16 category. Conquest was British Rapidplay Chess Champion in 1997. In 1995 and 2000 he shared first place at the Hastings Premier and in 2001, won the category 14 tournament in Clichy.

Following a relatively lean period, he capped his return to form in 2008 with victory in the British Chess Championship, defeating Keith Arkell in a two-game rapidplay play-off match for the title, after they tied for first place. In May 2009 he came first at the Capo d'Orso Open.

Since the mid-1990s, he has been a frequent member of the England team at the Olympiads and European Team Chess Championships.

A prolific player at international tournaments for many years, Conquest has in recent times been a regular commentator and (since 2011) tournament director of the Gibraltar Chess Festival, held annually at the Caleta Hotel in Catalan Bay.

Chess strength

His highest Elo rating was 2601, in the October 2001 FIDE rating list. He gained the International Master and Grandmaster titles in 1985 and 1991 respectively.

References

External links
 
Chessmetrics Player Profile: Stuart Conquest
Interview with Stuart Conquest Chessvibes.com (August 2008)
Tradewise Gibraltar Chess Festival

1967 births
Living people
Chess Olympiad competitors
Chess grandmasters
English chess players
People from Ilford
Sportspeople from Bristol
World Youth Chess Champions